Eduard Fischer may refer to:

Eduard Fischer (general) (1862–1935), Austrian general
Eduard Fischer (mycologist) (1861–1939), Swiss botanist and mycologist

See also
Eduardo Fischer (born 1980), Brazilian swimmer
Edward Fisher (disambiguation)